Vitória Di Felice Moraes (born August 18, 2000), better known as Viih Tube, is a Brazilian YouTuber and writer. She became known by her teen videos posted on YouTube.

Early life 
Vitória Di Felice Moraes (formerly Vitória Felício Moraes) was born on August 18, 2000, Sorocaba, in the interior of São Paulo. Daughter of Viviane Di Felice and Fabiano Moraes, she started her career at the age of 11 on the internet and began to become recognized in 2014. Gradually, she got thousands of subscribers on her channel, receiving media attention for her playful communication towards the teenage audience, addressing topics such as relationships, professional vocation and student aesthetics, acquiring commercial success and becoming a web celebrity.

Viih Tube said in an interview, "I have always liked television and wanted to have real viewers. I also wanted to teach what I know and the things I like. The idea came about because I was lonely a lot and had nothing to do."

Career 
In 2016, she began his career in the performing arts, performing the following year in a tour of his independent theater piece, specializing in cinematography. She made appearances in the children's telenovela Cúmplices de um Resgate and in the attraction Programa Raul Gil. In 2020, the feature film Amiga do Inimigo, directed by Plínio Scambora, a continuation of the teen drama web series Em Prova, was released by streaming Netflix in the platform's most watched movies ranking in Brazil and Portugal. The following year, on January 19, she was announced as a cabin contestant in the twenty-first edition of the reality show Big Brother Brasil. She was the 13th eliminated with 96.69% of the votes in a wall against singer Fiuk and economist Gilberto Nogueira, finishing in seventh place. In September, she starred together with Bianca Rinaldi and Júlio Cocielo in the special A Fantástica Máquina de Sonhos, playing juror Hebe Camargo. In October, she released her book "Cancelada", portraying the public rejection she received in her career.

Personal life

Activism 
In 2016, Vitória was accused of mistreating her pet. After the repercussions, she issued a retraction video note, starring in virtual attacks and being named as the most rejected digital figure in the month of October. In the same year, her mother sued comedian Felipe Neto for defamation and, in the first degree, the request was rejected. Later, Vitória returned to comment on the case and the death threats she experienced. After being diagnosed with depression, she became a supporter of the movement to value life and collaborated in raising awareness about mental health, the cancel culture, and suicide prevention during psychosocial support campaigns.

Awards and nominations

Filmography

Television

Movies

Internet

Books

References 

2000 births
People from Sorocaba
Living people
Brazilian YouTubers
Brazilian writers
Brazilian women writers
Big Brother Brasil
Big Brother (franchise) contestants